Detlev Karsten Rohwedder (16 October 1932 – 1 April 1991) was a German manager and politician, as member of the Social Democratic Party. He was named president of the Treuhandanstalt, responsible for the privatisation of state-owned property in the former German Democratic Republic (GDR), in September 1990, and served until his assassination in April 1991. He had also served as CEO of steel manufacturer Hoesch AG since 1980.

Murder
On Monday, April 1, 1991, at 23:30, Rohwedder was shot and killed through a window on the second floor of his house in the suburb of Düsseldorf-Niederkassel (Kaiser-Friedrich-Ring 71) by the first of three rifle shots. The second shot wounded his wife Hergard; the third hit a bookcase.

The shots were fired from 63 m away from a rifle chambered in 7.62×51mm NATO. It was also the same rifle that was used during a sniper attack on the American embassy in February committed by the Red Army Faction, a West German far-left terrorist group. An inspection of the scene found three cartridge cases, a plastic chair, a towel, and a letter claiming responsibility from an RAF unit named after Ulrich Wessel, a minor RAF figure who had died in 1975. The shooter has never been identified.

In 2001, a DNA analysis found that hair strands from the crime scene belonged to RAF member Wolfgang Grams. The Attorney General did not consider this evidence sufficient to name Grams as a suspect of the killing. Grams was killed in a shootout with police in Bad Kleinen in 1993.

On April 10, 1991, Rohwedder was honoured in Berlin with a day of mourning by German President Richard von Weizsäcker,  Minister-President of North Rhine-Westphalia, Johannes Rau, and Chairman of the Board of Treuhandanstalt Jens Odewald. The Detlev-Rohwedder-Haus, the seat of the Federal Finance Ministry, is named in his honour.

Films
In 2020, A Perfect Crime, a documentary about the Rohwedder assassination, was released by Netflix.

See also

List of unsolved murders

References

External links

1932 births
1991 deaths
1991 murders in Germany
Assassinated German people
Deaths by firearm in Germany
People from Gotha (town)
People murdered in Germany
Commanders Crosses of the Order of Merit of the Federal Republic of Germany
University of Hamburg alumni
Unsolved murders in Germany
Victims of the Red Army Faction